LSA or Lsa is an acronym standing for:

Education and academia
 Learning Support Assistant, (sometimes called Shadow Teacher) a teaching assistant of special education (usually on a one-to-one rôle) 
 Licence of the Society of Apothecaries
 Light: Science & Applications, a scientific journal
 Student Union of Latvia (Latvijas Studentu apvienība)

Institutions
 University of Michigan College of Literature, Science, and the Arts
University of Liverpool School of Architecture, England, UK
 La Salle Academy, a Catholic, all-boys high school in New York
 Lakshmipat Singhania Academy, a non-profit school group in India

Military
 Light Small Arms
 Logistics Support Analysis, a military support planning methodology
 Logistics Support Area, a large military depot
 London Small Arms Co. Ltd, an English gun-making firm between 1866 and 1935
 Lubricant, Semi-fluid, Automatic Weapons, MIL-L-46000

Organizations

 Law and Society Association
 Law Society of Alberta
 League for Socialist Action, a Canadian political group active in the 1960s and 70s
 Learn and Serve America, a U.S. government community service program
 Licentiate of the Society of Apothecaries
 Linguistic Society of America
 Lithuanian Space Association, Lithuania's space agency
 Luxembourg Space Agency, national space agency of the Grand-Duchy of Luxembourg
 Local Spiritual Assembly, an administrative body of the Bahá'í Faith
 Lone Scouts of America, an independent Scouting organization that merged into the Boy Scouts of America
 Lone Star Alliance, lacrosse-only athletic conference
 Lutheran Services in America, the largest network of human service organizations in the United States
 Student Union of Latvia (Latvijas Studentu apvienība)

Places 

 London Stansted Airport
 Lytham St. Annes, seaside town in Lancashire, England
 LSA, IATA airport code of Losuia Airport in Papua New Guinea

Science and technology
 Late Stone Age 
 Least squares adjustment 
 Anterolateral central arteries of the brain
 Lichen sclerosus et atrophicus, a skin disease
 Light-sport aircraft
 Lobe Separation Angle, see cam
 Lsa, the abbreviation for the orchid genus Luisia
 Lysergic acid amide (ergine), a compound closely related to LSD
 Lötfrei, schraubfrei, abisolierfrei, an insulation-displacement connector for telecommunications
 Liver stage antigen, a set of peptides
 Low specific activity, radioactive substances produced by oil and gas production installations. Also referred to as NORM, naturally occurring radioactive material

Computing
 Latent semantic analysis, a technique in natural language processing
 Link-state advertisement, communication mechanism of the OSPF routing protocol for IP
 Local Security Authority Subsystem Service (Local Security Authority), the centre of the Windows NT security subsystem (lsass.exe)
License and Services Agreement

Other uses
 Lighting & Sound America, an entertainment technology magazine published by PLASA Media Inc
 Linseed Sunflower Almond, a health food that is a ground mixture of these three seeds.
 Limited symptom attack, a milder form of panic attack, with fewer than four panic-related symptoms
 Life-saving appliance, the multitude of devices designed for saving lifes typically found on a ship. Ranging from e.g. rescue boat to SART. 
 Language Study Abroad through Dartmouth College